George Foster (born in Cincinnati, Ohio) was an American amateur champion and professional boxer.

Amateur career
Representing Ohio, Foster won the 1960 United States Amateur Featherweight Championship, the 1962 United States Amateur Lightweight Championship and 1962 Golden Gloves Featherweight Championship.

Pro career
Known as "Kid Foster", Foster turned pro in 1962 and retired in 1972 after a TKO loss to Esteban De Jesús, a bout in which Foster was knocked down once in the 2nd, 3rd, and 6th rounds.

External links

Boxers from Cincinnati
Year of birth missing
Possibly living people
American male boxers
Featherweight boxers